Central Reservation is the second studio album by English singer-songwriter Beth Orton, released on 9 March 1999. The album featured contributions from folk musician Terry Callier (with whom she also recorded the b-side "Lean on Me"), Dr. Robert and Ben Harper. Several tracks were also produced by Ben Watt of Everything but the Girl.

Central Reservation received critical acclaim and garnered Orton a second Mercury Music Prize nomination, and won her Best British Female at the 2000 BRIT Music Awards.

Release
Central Reservation was released on 9 March 1999 on Heavenly Records. It reached number 17 on the UK Albums Chart and stayed on the chart for eight weeks. It went to number 34 on the ARIA albums chart in Australia, number 35 on the RIANZ albums chart in New Zealand and number 110 on the Billboard 200 chart in the United States. It also went to number two on the US Heatseekers albums chart. By 2002 it had sold 244,000 copies in United States. The first single from the album was "Stolen Car", which was released on 13 March 1999 and peaked at number 34 on the UK Singles Chart. "Central Reservation", the second single, peaked at number 37 on the UK Singles Chart.

On 30 June 2014, British independent record label 3 Loop Music re-released Central Reservation as a 2CD Expanded Edition which included b-sides, original demos and live recordings.

Reception

Central Reservation received generally positive reviews from critics. Jason Ankeny of AllMusic gave the album a rating of 4.5 stars out of 5 and called it "stunning".

Orton won the award for British Female Solo at the 2000 BRIT Awards. The album is included in the book 1001 Albums You Must Hear Before You Die.

The album is ranked number 982 in All-Time Top 1000 Albums (3rd. edition, 2000).

Track listing

Notes
 signifies remixer

Personnel

Music
Ted Barnes — acoustic guitar, bouzouki, guitar, slide guitar
Will Blanchard — drums
Terry Callier — background vocals
Calina de la Mare — violin
Dr. Robert — guitar
Beki Doe — violin
Dr. John — piano
David Friedman — vibraphone
Ali Friend — bass
Lascelles Gordon — percussion
Howard Gott — violin
Ruth Gottlieb — violin
Ben Harper — electric guitar
Oliver Kraus — cello
Henry Olsen — bass
Beth Orton — acoustic guitar, guitar, vocals
Sean Read — piano, keyboards
Becca Ware — viola
Andy Waterworth — double bass
Ben Watt — guitar, keyboards
Lucy Wilkins — violin
Sara Wilson — cello

Production
Andy Bradfield — mixing
Dr. Robert — producer, mixing
Beki Doe — mixing
Giles Hall — engineer
Peter Hill — assistant engineer
Oliver Kraus — mixing
Dick Meaney — engineer
Beth Orton — producer
David Roback — producer, mixing
Trevor Smith — engineer
Mark "Spike" Stent — producer
Victor Van Vugt — producer, engineer
Paul Walton — mixing assistant
Ben Watt — programming, noise, producer, engineer, mixing
John Wood — engineer
Tim Young — mastering
Design
Sam Harris — photography

Charts

Certifications and sales

References

Beth Orton albums
1999 albums
Albums produced by Victor Van Vugt
Arista Records albums